The Commanding General of the Philippine Air Force is the overall commander and senior general of the Philippine Air Force, the aerial warfare branch of the Armed Forces of the Philippines. It is normally held by a three-star rank of Lieutenant General. The holder of the position has operational control and is responsible for overall operations of the service, and directly reports to the Chief of Staff of the armed forces.

List
The following are the Commanding Generals/Chiefs of the Philippine Air Force since its foundation in 1947, with some generals commanding various units from the Philippine Army Air Corps until it was replaced by the Philippine Air Force in 1947.

Commanding Generals

See also
Armed Forces of the Philippines
Chief of Staff of the Armed Forces of the Philippines
Philippine Air Force 
Philippine Navy

References 

Philippine Air Force
Philippines